Cathedral Parish School, now known as Wheeling Catholic Elementary, was a historic elementary school building located at Wheeling, Ohio County, West Virginia. It was built in 1896–1897, to service the St. Joseph Cathedral parish.  A gymnasium addition was built in 1939. It is a three-story brick building, with an elevated first floor. It sits on a sandstone base. It features a center square tower with a pyramidal roof and Late Gothic Revival details.

It was listed on the National Register of Historic Places in 1997.  It is located in the East Wheeling Historic District.

Gallery

References

School buildings on the National Register of Historic Places in West Virginia
Buildings and structures in Wheeling, West Virginia
Landmarks in West Virginia
Gothic Revival architecture in West Virginia
Schools in Ohio County, West Virginia
National Register of Historic Places in Wheeling, West Virginia
School buildings completed in 1897
Catholic schools in West Virginia
Individually listed contributing properties to historic districts on the National Register in West Virginia
Roman Catholic Diocese of Wheeling-Charleston
1896 establishments in West Virginia